Forced assimilation is an involuntary process of cultural assimilation of religious or ethnic minority groups during which they are forced to adopt language, national identity, norms, mores, customs, traditions, values, mentality, perceptions, way of life, and often religion and ideology of established and generally larger community belonging to dominant culture by government. Also enforcement of a new language in legislation, education, literature, worshiping counts as forced assimilation. Unlike ethnic cleansing, the local population is not outright destroyed and may or may not be forced to leave a certain area. Instead the assimilation of the population is made mandatory. This is also called mandatory assimilation by scholars who study genocide and nationalism. Mandatory assimilation has sometimes been made a policy of new or contested nations, often during or in the aftermath of a war. Some examples are both the German and French forced assimilation in the provinces Alsace and (at least a part of) Lorraine, and some decades after the Swedish conquests of the Danish provinces Scania, Blekinge and Halland the local population was submitted to forced assimilation, or even the forced assimilation of ethnic Teochews in Bangkok by the Siam government during World War I until the 1973 uprising.

Ethnic

If a state puts extreme emphasis on a homogeneous national identity, it may resort, especially in the case of minorities originating from historical foes, to harsh, even extreme measures to 'exterminate' the minority culture, sometimes to the point of considering the only alternative its physical elimination (expulsion or even genocide).

States, mostly based on the idea of nation, perceived the presence of ethnic or linguistic minorities as a danger for their own territorial integrity. In fact minorities could claim their own independence, or to be rejoined with their own motherland. The consequence was the weakening or disappearing of several ethnic minorities.

The latter half of the 19th century and the first half of the 20th century saw the rise of nationalism, which asserts the right to homeland for each nation with a common heritage through race, religion, language and culture. Previously, a country consisted largely of whatever peoples lived on the land that was under the dominion of a particular ruler. Thus, as principalities and kingdoms grew through conquest and marriage, a ruler could wind up with peoples of many different ethnicities under his dominion. This also reflected the long history of migrations of different tribes and peoples throughout Europe. Much of European history in the latter half of the 19th century and the first half of the 20th century can be understood as efforts to realign national boundaries with this concept of "one people, one nation".

Much conflict would arise when one nation asserted territorial rights to land outside its borders on the basis of a common bond with the people living on that land. (Example: organized territorial rights by Russia for Georgia's breakaway province of South Ossetia to North Ossetia) Another source of conflict arose when a group of people who constituted a minority in one nation would seek to secede from the nation either to form an independent nation or join another nation with whom they felt stronger ties. Yet another source of conflict was the desire of some nations to expel people from territory within its borders on the ground that those people did not share a common bond with the majority of people living in that nation.

It is useful to contrast the mass migrations and forced expulsion of ethnic Germans out of Eastern Europe with other massive population transfers, such as population exchange between Greece and Turkey, and population exchanges that occurred after the Partition of India. In all cases those expelled suffered greatly. Forced migrations took place after each of the two world wars.

East Asia
In Japan and Korea, as each country stated themselves as a single-nation country, ethnic minorities had to hide their national identity for centuries, and many resulted in assimilation, such as Ainu and Ryukyuan people in Japan, migrants of Goguryeo, Balhae and Tungusic peoples in Korea.

Thailand sought to assimilate its many Chinese immigrants by only granting Thai citizenship if they renounced all loyalty to China, learned to speak Thai, changed their names, and sent their children to Thai schools.

China

At least one million members of China's Muslim Uyghur minority have been detained in mass detention camps in Xinjiang, termed "reeducation camps", aimed at changing the political thinking of detainees, their identities, and their religious beliefs.

North America 

In the United States and Canada, forced assimilation had been practiced against indigenous peoples through the Canadian Indian residential school system and American Indian boarding schools. The same assimilation was also faced by French and Spanish speaking peoples populating the US and Canada, through language bans, violence, and extreme prejudice by anglophones into and throughout the 20th century.

In the United States, during World War I, the American government burned most German books, banned the use of German in public places and renamed many places that previously had German names with more English-sounding words; the forced assimilation was highly successful. Before that, the German American community at large had refused assimilation, and retained their German traditions, such as having beers on Sundays. German also was the major language in many parts of the country.

Europe

Ukraine 
In December 2017, Reuters reported that "Ukraine's neighbors have a right to criticize a new Ukrainian law banning schools from teaching in minority languages beyond primary school level, a leading European rights watchdog said".

Latvia 
Permanent Representative of the Russian Federation to the Organization for Security and Co-operation in Europe Alexander Lukashevich has criticised Latvia's 2019–2021 education reform as a "discriminatory policy with the goal of forced assimilation of the Russian-speaking population."

Russia 
As part of the ongoing Russian invasion of Ukraine the Russian government forcibly relocated thousands of Ukrainian children to Russia and adopted them out to Russian families, a process that is in violation of the forced assimilation prohibition of the Genocide Convention. On March 17, 2023 the International Criminal Court issued arrest warrants for Russian President Vladimir Putin and Russian Children's Rights Commissioner Maria Alekseyevna Lvova-Belova for their roles in this alleged war crime.

Religious

Assimilation also includes the (often forced) conversion or secularization of religious members of a minority group.

Throughout the Middle Ages and until the mid-19th century, most Jews in Europe were forced to live in small towns (shtetls) and were restricted from entering universities or high-level professions.

During the Cambodian Genocide, Cham Muslims were persecuted by the Khmer Rouge regime, first through forced assimilation, but later through direct violence (mass killing, raiding and destroying their villages).

National

When new immigrants enter a country, there is a tension as they adapt to new people and surroundings to fit in, while holding on to their original culture. Here, studies show that native inhabitants often expect assimilation especially from negatively viewed immigrants. Moreover, assimilation pressure seems to be particularly pronounced toward second generation.

See also

 Acculturation
 Cultural genocide
 Cultural imperialism
 Diaspora politics
 Ethnic interest group
 Ethnocide
 Hegemony
 Intercultural competence
 Linguistic discrimination
 Language shift
 Language death
 "More Irish than the Irish themselves"
 Stolen Generations
Outline of Genocide studies
 Umvolkung
Arabization
Russification
Slavicisation
Germanisation
Kurdification
Kurdification of Yazidis
Turkification
Romanization
Sovietization
Europeanisation
Islamization

References

Further reading
 Bibliography of Genocide studies

Cultural assimilation
Cultural genocide